Corrente is a surname. Notable people with the surname include:

 Matt Corrente (born 1988), Canadian ice-hockey player
 Michael Corrente (born 1959), American film director and producer
 Robert Clark Corrente, American attorney
 Tony Corrente (born 1951), American football official